Entanglement is a 2017 Canadian romantic comedy-drama film directed by Jason James and written by Jason Filiatrault. It stars Thomas Middleditch, Jess Weixler, Diana Bang, and Randal Edwards, and follows Ben (Middleditch) who forms a romance with Hanna (Weixler) after discovering through various means that they could have almost ended up siblings. This is the first feature film produced through Dark Star Pictures and premiered at the Seattle International Film Festival on March 19, 2017, before being theatrically released on February 2, 2018.

Synopsis
Ben Layten, a recent divorcee, leads a miserable, jobless life. After several suicide attempts, he ends up befriending his sarcastic, yet helpful neighbor Tabby Song. While constructing how his life fell apart through quantum entanglement, Ben learns that he almost had an adoptive sister. Feeling that this is the key to his happiness he sets out to find her only to learn that it is a woman he met earlier named Hanna Weathers. Through constant visitations with her, Ben falls in love with her and learns that life and love are far more complicated than he thought.

Cast
 Thomas Middleditch as Ben Layten
 Jess Weixler as Hanna Weathers
 Diana Bang as Tabby Song
 Randal Edwards as Joel
 Johannah Newmarch as Dr. Jill Franklyn
 Nicole LaPlaca as Chloe
 Marilyn Norry as Betty Layten

Reception
On review aggregator website Rotten Tomatoes, the film holds an approval rating of 61% based on 33 reviews, and an average rating of 5.9/10. The website's critical consensus reads, "Entanglement proves there's still room for charmingly quirky romantic comedies -- even if it flirts with a number of ingredients that typically lead to cutesy disaster." On Metacritic, the film has a weighted average score of 54 out of 100, based on 13 critics, indicating "mixed or average reviews".

References

External links
 
 
 

2017 films
English-language Canadian films
Canadian comedy-drama films
2010s English-language films
2010s Canadian films